Mistusinne is a resort village in the Canadian province of Saskatchewan within Census Division No. 7. It is on the shores of Gordon McKenzie Arm of the South Saskatchewan River in the Rural Municipality of Maple Bush No. 224.

History 
The resort village's name is derived from the Plains Cree word mistasiniy or mistaseni (meaning "big stone"), which refers to a 400-ton glacial erratic that resembled a sleeping bison. It once rested in the Qu'Appelle Valley and served as a sacred gathering place for the Cree and Assiniboine peoples. before Lake Diefenbaker was built. During the South Saskatchewan River dam project, the erratic was in the flood path of the new reservoir that would become Lake Diefenbaker. In 1966, the Prairie Farm Rehabilitation Administration had the rock blasted apart with explosives, despite efforts by groups to save it. Pieces of the rock were used in monuments to Chief Poundmaker and a memorial to the boulder itself in Elbow. Large fragments were located under the waters of the lake in 2014.

Mistusinne incorporated as a resort village on August 1, 1980.

Demographics 

Attractions 
Douglas Provincial Park extends from the community to the Qu'Appelle River Dam. The community serves as a summer retreat that contains many cabins and a golf course, with a view of Lake Diefenbaker. Part of the golf course along the shore had to be rebuilt when Lake Diefenbaker's water rose in 1998 and collapsed the shoreline.

Government 
The Resort Village of Mistusinne is governed by an elected municipal council and an appointed clerk that meets on the third Saturday of every month.

See also 
List of communities in Saskatchewan
List of municipalities in Saskatchewan
List of resort villages in Saskatchewan
List of villages in Saskatchewan
List of summer villages in Alberta
List of place names in Canada of Indigenous origin

References

External links 

Resort villages in Saskatchewan
Maple Bush No. 224, Saskatchewan
Division No. 7, Saskatchewan